Nitric oxide reductase (menaquinol) is an enzyme. This enzyme catalyses the following chemical reaction

 2 nitric oxide + menaquinol  nitrous oxide + menaquinone + H2O

Nitric oxide reductase contains copper.

In 2015 the laboratory that had characterized the Bacillus azotoformans enzyme wrote, "The copper-A-dependent Nor from Bacillus azotoformans uses cytochrome c551 as electron donor but lacks menaquinol activity, in contrast to our earlier report."

References

External links 
 

EC 1.7.5